Fiançailles pour rire ("Betrothal for Laughs"), FP 101, is a song cycle of six mélodies for voice and piano by Francis Poulenc on poems from the collection of the same name by Louise de Vilmorin. Composed in 1939, it was premiered on 21 March 1942 at Salle Gaveau by the soprano Geneviève Touraine and the composer as the pianist.

 La Dame d'André
 Dans l'herbe
 Il vole
 Mon cadavre est doux comme un gant
 Violon
 Fleurs

References

External links 
 Fiançailles pour rire sur data.bnf.fr
 Original text by de Villmorin in French and English
 Fiançailles pour rire - Mélodies françaises on ForumOpera
 Fiançailles pour rire, song cycle for voice & piano, FP 101 on ALLMUSIC
 Mady Mesplé; Fiançailles pour rire on YouTube

Compositions by Francis Poulenc
Poulenc
1939 compositions
Music based on poems